
Działdowo County is a unit of territorial administration and local government (powiat) in Warmian-Masurian Voivodeship, northern Poland. It came into being on January 1, 1999, as a result of the Polish local government reforms passed in 1998. (This should not be confused with Lidzbark Warmiński, another town in Warmian-Masurian Voivodeship, which is the seat of Lidzbark County.)

As of 2019 its total population is 65,288, out of which the population of Działdowo is 21,279, that of Lidzbark is 7,794, and the rural population is 36,215.

Neighbouring counties
Działdowo County is bordered by Ostróda County to the north, Nidzica County to the north-east, Mława County to the south-east, Żuromin County to the south-west, Brodnica County and Nowe Miasto County to the west, and Iława County to the north-west.

Administrative division
The county is subdivided into six gminas (one urban, one urban-rural and four rural). These are listed in the following table, in descending order of population.

References

 
Land counties of Warmian-Masurian Voivodeship